The 2002 Ole Miss Rebels football team represented the University of Mississippi during the 2002 NCAA Division I-A football season. The team participated as members of the Southeastern Conference in the West Division. Coached by David Cutcliffe, the Rebels played their home games at Vaught–Hemingway Stadium in Oxford, Mississippi.

Schedule

Roster

References

Ole Miss
Ole Miss Rebels football seasons
Independence Bowl champion seasons
Ole Miss Rebels football